Here is a studio album by Dutch record producer Nicolay, one half of the duo The Foreign Exchange. It was released on BBE in 2006. It features guest appearances from Darien Brockington, Black Spade, Wiz Khalifa, Yahzarah, Kay, and Sy Smith.

Reception
Nathan Rabin of The A.V. Club gave Here a grade of A−, saying: "While even the most distinctive producers can lose their footing when turning over beats to an album's worth of guests, Nicolay's strong sonic personality gives the album a surprising level of cohesion and continuity."

Meanwhile, Marisa Brown of AllMusic gave the album 3 stars out of 5 and said, "[Here] isn't a bad album, it's just becomes pretty formulaic, and when the formula's not that exciting to begin with, well, it leaves you wanting something more, something that will probably never come."

Track listing

References

External links
 

2006 albums
Albums produced by Nicolay (musician)
Barely Breaking Even albums